Viorel Năstase (born 7 October 1953) is a Romanian former professional footballer who played as a forward.

Club career
Viorel Năstase was born on 7 October 1953 in București, Romania and started to play football in the 1969–70 Divizia B season for Progresul București. In the following season he made his Divizia A debut on 7 October 1953 in a 2–1 away loss against Farul Constanța, having scored a total of 9 goals by the end of the season, being partner in the team's offence with Mircea Sandu. Afterwards he went to play for Steaua București for 8 seasons, in the first one taking part in the club's 1971–72 European Cup Winners' Cup campaign, playing five games as the team reached the quarter-finals by eliminating Hibernians and Barcelona against whom he scored three goals, being eliminated after 1–1 on aggregate on the away goal rule by Bayern Munich. He won two Divizia A titles with The Military Men in the 1975–76 and 1977–78 seasons, being used by coach Emerich Jenei in 21 matches in which he scored four goals in the first one and in 12 games in which he scored six goals in the second. He also helped Steaua win two Cupa României and played for the club in one more match against Barcelona in which he scored a goal from the 1977–78 UEFA Cup edition, however the game was lost with 5–1. He defected from Romania's communist regime to Switzerland where he asked for political asylum in 1979 after a game between Steaua and Young Boys Bern from the 1979–80 European Cup Winners' Cup. After being suspended one year from playing football which was a rule for players who defect from the Eastern Bloc to the West, he went to play in West Germany at Bundesliga club, 1860 Munich where he was the team's top-goalscorer in the 1980–81 season with 14 goals in 23 matches, including a hat-trick against Bayer Uerdingen, being partner in the offence with Rudi Völler, however the team relegated at the end of the season and also coach Carl-Heinz Rühl wanted to throw him out of the team before the start of the season because of his drunken escapades in bars. After playing two more games in the 1981–82 2. Bundesliga for 1860 Munich, he was transferred for 400.000 italian lira in Italy at Serie A club, Catanzaro where he was brought to replace Massimo Palanca, however during his three seasons spent at the club, of which the last was in Serie B, Năstase scored only three goals as his performance was affected by his excessive nightlife activity, getting drunk in parties and clubs. After three more games played in the 1984–85 Austrian Bundesliga season at SV Salzburg, Năstase retired from playing football at age 31. Viorel Năstase has a total of 193 matches and 86 goals scored in Divizia A, 23 matches and 14 goals scored in Bundesliga, 23 games and two goals scored in Serie A and 6 games played with four goals scored in European competitions.

International career
Viorel Năstase played one game at international level for Romania on 12 May 1976 under coach Ștefan Kovács in a 1–0 loss against Bulgaria from the 1973–76 Balkan Cup final.

Honours
Progresul București
Divizia B: 1969–70
Steaua București
Divizia A: 1975–76, 1977–78
Cupa României: 1975–76, 1978–79
Torneo di Viareggio Third place: 1973

Notes

References

External links

1953 births
Living people
Romanian defectors
Romanian footballers
Romania international footballers
Olympic footballers of Romania
Romanian expatriate footballers
FC Steaua București players
FC Progresul București players
Association football forwards
Liga I players
Liga II players
TSV 1860 Munich players
U.S. Catanzaro 1929 players
FC Red Bull Salzburg players
Bundesliga players
2. Bundesliga players
Austrian Football Bundesliga players
Serie A players
Serie B players
Expatriate footballers in Germany
Expatriate footballers in Italy
Expatriate footballers in Austria